Invasive species found in Africa include:

Plants

Acacia species (Australian wattles)
Argemone mexicana (Mexican poppy)
Caesalpinia decapetala (Mauritius thorn)
Cereus jamacaru (Queen of the Night cactus)
Chromolaena odorata (Triffid weed)
Eichhornia crassipes (Water hyacinth)
Eucalyptus spp. (Eucalyptus or gum trees)
Hakea spp.
Lantana camara
Melia azedarach (Persian lilac, chinaberry)
Myriophyllum aquaticum (Parrot's feather)
Opuntia spp. (Prickly pear)
Pereskia aculeata
Pinus spp. (Pine)
Prosopis spp. (Mesquite)
Ricinus communis (Castor oil plant)
Rubus spp. (Bramble)<ref>[http://www.issg.org/database/species/distribution.asp?si=476&fr=1&sts=tss&lang=EN Rubus moluccanus' alien range]. Global Invasive Species Database. Retrieved on 2009-04-09.</ref>Rubus rosifolius alien range. Global Invasive Species Database. Retrieved on 2009-04-09.Salvinia molesta (Kariba weed, giant salvinia)Solanum mauritianum (Bugweed)

Tunicates
 Ciona intestinalis (sea vase) 

AnnelidsFicopomatus enigmaticus (Australian tubeworm)
 Boccardia proboscidea (shell worm) 

Molluscs
 Aplexa marmorata (marbled tadpole snail) Bradybaena similaris (Asian trampsnail)Cochlicella barbara (potbellied helicellid)Cornu aspersum (garden snail)
 Deroceras invadens (tramp slug)Deroceras laeve (marsh slug)
 Euglandina rosea (rosy wolfsnail) Limax flavus (yellow slug)Milax gagates (greenhouse slug)Mytilus galloprovincialis (Mediterranean mussel)
 Pinctada radiata (Gulf pearl oyster) Pseudosuccinea columella (mimic lymnaea) 
 Semimytilus algosus (Pacific mussel) Tarebia granifera (quilted melania) Theba pisana (white garden snail)Zonitoides arboreus (quick gloss)

Crustaceans
 Carcinus maenas (European shore crab)
 Cherax quadricarinatus (redclaw crayfish)
 Limnoria quadripunctata (gribble) 
 Percnon gibbesi (Sally Lightfoot crab)
 Procambarus clarkii (red swamp crawfish) 
 Procambarus virginalis (Marbled crayfish)

ArachnidsPhalangium opilioInsects
 Aedes albopictus (Asian tiger mosquito) 
 Aleurodicus dispersus (spiralling whitefly)
 Aleurothrixus floccosus (woolly whitefly) 
 Aleurotrachelus atratus (palm-infesting whitefly) 
 Anoplolepis gracilipes (yellow crazy ant) 
 Aphis spiraecola (green citrus aphid) 
 Aulacaspis yasumatsui (cycad aulacaspis scale) 
 Bactrocera cucurbitae (melon fly)
 Bactrocera dorsalis (Oriental fruit fly) 
 Bactrocera invadens (Asian fruit fly)
 Bactrocera zonata (peach fruit fly) 
 Bemisia tabaci (silverleaf whitefly)
 Cactoblastis cactorum (cactus moth) 
 Ceratitis capitata (Mediterranean fruit fly) 
 Ceratitis rosa (Natal fruit fly) 
 Chionaspis pinifoliae (pine needle scale insect) 
 Cinara cupressi (cypress aphid) 
 Coptotermes formosanus (Formosan subterranean termite)
 Cosmopolites sordidus (banana root borer) 
 Cryptotermes brevis (West Indian drywood termite)
 Ctenarytaina eucalypti (blue gum psyllid) 
 Diuraphis noxia (Russian wheat aphid) 
 Eulachnus rileyi (pine needle aphid) 
 Euwallacea fornicatus (tea shot hole borer) 
 Frankliniella occidentalis  (western flower thrips) 
 Harmonia axyridis (Asian lady beetle) 
 Hylastes ater (black pine bark beetle)
 Hylurgus ligniperda (red-haired pine bark beetle) 
 Icerya purchasi (cottony cushion scale) 
 Linepithema humile (Argentine ant)
 Liriomyza trifolii (American serpentine leafminer)
 Maconellicoccus hirsutus (hibiscus mealybug)
 Orthotomicus erosus (Mediterranean pine engraver) 
 Phenacoccus manihoti (cassava mealybug) 
 Phenacoccus solenopsis (cotton mealybug) 
 Pineus pini (pine woolly aphid) 
 Polistes dominula (European paper wasp 
 Prostephanus truncatus (larger grain borer)
 Pseudococcus calceolariae (Citrophilus mealybug) 
 Sirex noctilio (Sirex woodwasp)
 Spodoptera frugiperda (fall armyworm)
 Technomyrmex albipes (white-footed ant) 
 Thaumastocoris peregrinus (bronze bug) 
 Trialeurodes ricini (castor bean whitefly) 
 Trichomyrmex destructor (destructive trailing ant) 
 Vespula germanica (European wasp)
 Wasmannia auropunctata (electric ant)
 Xyleborinus saxesenii (fruit-tree pinhole borer) 
 Xyleborus perforans (island pinhole borer) 
 Xylosandrus compactus (black twig borer) 

Fish
 Ctenopharyngodon idella (grass carp) 
 Cyprinus carpio (common carp) 
 Gambusia affinis (western mosquitofish) 
 Gambusia holbrooki (eastern mosquitofish) 
 Hypophthalmichthys molitrix (silver carp) 
 Lates niloticus (Nile perch)
 Lepomis macrochirus (bluegill) 
 Micropterus dolomieu (smallmouth bass) 
 Micropterus floridanus (Florida bass) 
 Micropterus punctulatus (spotted bass) 
 Micropterus salmoides (largemouth bass) 
 Oreochromis niloticus (Nile tilapia) 
 Perca fluviatilis (European perch) 
 Pterygoplichthys disjunctivus (vermiculated sailfin catfish) 
 Salmo salar (Atlantic salmon) 
 Tinca tinca (tench) 

Amphibians
 Amietophrynus gutturalis (guttural toad) 

Reptiles
 Emys orbicularis (European pond turtle) 
 Gehyra mutilata (stump-tailed gecko) 
 Hemidactylus frenatus (common house gecko)
 Lepidodactylus lugubris (mourning gecko) 
 Tarentola mauritanica (Moorish wall gecko) 
 Trachemys scripta ssp. elegans (red-eared slider)

Birds
 Acridotheres tristis (common myna)
 Anas platyrhynchos (mallard)
 Columba livia (rock dove)
 Corvus splendens (house crow) 
 Fringilla coelebs (common chaffinch) 
 Passer domesticus (house sparrow)
 Psittacula krameri (rose-ringed parakeet) 
 Quelea quelea (red-billed quelea)
 Sturnus vulgaris (common starling) 
 Tyto alba (western barn owl) 

Mammals
 Ammotragus lervia (Barbary sheep) 
 Canis lupus (feral dog)
 Capra aegagrus (wild goat)
 Dama dama (fallow deer)
 Equus africanus (feral donkey)
 Felis silvestris (feral cat)
 Funambulus palmarum (three-striped palm squirrel)
 Hemitragus jemlahicus (Himalayan tahr)
 Herpestes javanicus (small Asian mongoose) 
 Macaca fascicularis (crab-eating macaque)
 Mus musculus (house mouse)
 Myocastor coypus (coypu) 
 Oryctolagus cuniculus (European rabbit)
 Ovis orientalis (mouflon) 
 Rattus norvegicus (brown rat)
 Rattus rattus (black rat)
 Suncus murinus (Asian house shrew) 
 Sus scrofa'' (wild boar)

References

·Invasive species
Africa
L
cs:Seznam invazních živočichů
fr:Liste d'espèces invasives
nl:Lijst van invasieve soorten
ru:Список инвазивных видов